Cilia and flagella associated protein 157 (CFAP157) also known as chromosome 9 open reading frame 117 (c9orf117) is a protein that in humans is encoded by the CFAP157 gene.

CFAP157 gene is "specifically required during spermatogenesis for flagellum morphogenesis and sperm motility and may be required to suppress the formation of supernumerary axonemes and ensure a correct ultrastructure," according to UniProt.

Gene

Location 
CFAP157 is located on chromosome 9, 9q34.11 in human from base pair 127,706,989 to base pair 127,716,002.

Features 
The size of the gene is 9,013 bases, and the orientation is plus strand. The gene holds 9 exons.

mRNA 
The most common variant of mRNAs of CFAP157 contains 1,722 base pairs.

Expression 
CFAP157 is expressed in many human body tissues such as cervix, lung, testis, and uterus. People who have uterine tumor are likely to have an expression in CFAP157. This gene is expressed in both adults and fetuses.

Protein
There are 520 amino acids in CFAP157 in human. The protein is glutamine extremely rich, and glycine poor. The protein is quite neutral with the isoelectric point at pH 7.4. The average mass of the protein is estimated to be 60,531.748 Da, and the absorption coefficient is estimated to be 25,440 M−1 cm−1.

CFAP157 is primarily composed of α-helices, and there is no transmembrane helix. The protein structure making program called Phyre is used to create the predicted structure of CFAP157.

Homology

There is no known paralog for CFAP157 in human. CFAP157 has numerous orthologs. The following table contains some of orthologs including human, common chimpanzee, rhesus macaque, cattle, dog, mouse, rat, tropical clawed frog, and zebra fish.

Interacting Proteins 
P14335 (Kunjin virus strain MRM61C) is the virus that interacts with CFAP157 via two-hybrid screening. Kunjin virus is not as severe as other viruses, but this is a noticeable discovery because it is possible to exploit the interaction to develop new types of medicine. Researchers at the University of Queensland discovered a new medical use for the Kunjin virus in 2005, and the possible treatments include HIV/cancer vaccines.

References